Six English Towns (1978), Six More English Towns (1981) and Another Six English Towns (1984) are three television documentary series presented by architectural historian Alec Clifton-Taylor for BBC Two. In the series, Clifton-Taylor visits an English town and discusses their history and architectural character, with a particular focus on the building materials.

A writer on architecture, Clifton-Taylor came to television late in life. He was introduced by his friend Nikolaus Pevsner to BBC arts producer John Drummond who was planning a series on British architecture called Spirit of the Age. Drummond asked Clifton-Taylor to present the first episode about medieval English architecture, which was broadcast in October 1975.

Based on the success of this episode, Clifton-Taylor was teamed with producer Denis Moriarty to present a series of studies of English towns, discussing the genius loci similar to his chapters in Pevsner's Buildings of England and the AA Touring Guide to England. The Radio Times stated that the initial six towns were chosen "based not so much on the historical appeal of a fine cathedral, a castle or a church but the range and quality of the ordinary domestic houses and the use made of the traditional building materials of England - stone, brick, wood and plaster." Clifton-Taylor said "I'd like every programme to be an exercise in looking."

Episodes
Three series were made in total; series 1 episodes were 30 minute in duration, series 2 episodes were extended to 40 minutes, but returned to 30 for series 3.

Series 1 and 2 feature the final movement of Thomas Arne's Symphony No. 2 in F major as their title music (which Clifton-Taylor later chose as one of his Desert Island Discs), series 3 has an original score composed by Jim Parker.

Series 1 - Six English Towns

Series 2 - Six More English Towns

Series 3 - Another Six English Towns

Reviews
Architectural writer Jonathan Glancey cites them as a formative influence for his passion for architecture: "It wouldn't work today. A lovely old duffer in a Viyella shirt, tweed jacket and wobbly hat pottering about six small English towns with a camera crew in tow and speaking quietly of their simple virtues...I still think these programmes are some of the best made on architecture, buildings and places, because I learned so much from them, liked their lack of pretension, their quiet passion and Clifton-Taylor's great ability as a communicator."

Media releases
Each series was accompanied by its own book, and DVDs of the three series were released in 2016 and 2017. A box set of the three series was released 5 November 2018, entitled Six English Towns The Complete Collection and includes a discussion between John Julius Norwich and Alec Clifton-Taylor called In Search of the Spirit of the age shown before the BBC2 repeat of the series Spirit of the Age in May 1976. Producer Denis Moriarty provided a new commentary on the episodes about Chichester, Saffron Walden and Cirencester.

References

1978 British television series debuts
BBC television documentaries